Brezovo is a town in Southern Bulgaria.

Brezovo may also refer to:

Bulgaria
Brezovo Municipality, a municipality of Plovdiv Province

Slovenia
Brezovo, Litija, a village in the Municipality of Litija, central Slovenia
Brezovo, Sevnica, a village in the Municipality of Sevnica, southeastern Slovenia
Dolnje Brezovo, a village in the Municipality of Sevnica, southeastern Slovenia
Gorenje Brezovo, a village in the Municipality of Ivančna Gorica, southeastern Slovenia
Gornje Brezovo, a village in the Municipality of Sevnica, southeastern Slovenia
Spodnje Brezovo, a village in the Municipality of Ivančna Gorica, southeastern Slovenia

See also
Brezova (disambiguation)